Adam John Sztykiel is an American television and film producer and screenwriter known for such television series and films as Undateable, which he also created based on the book, Undateable: 311 Things Guys do That Guarantee They Won't be Dating or Having Sex, by Ellen Rakieten and Anne Coyle; Due Date and Made of Honor.

Early life 
Sztykiel was born in Detroit, Michigan.

In 2000, he graduated from University of Southern California.

Career 
Sztykiel based the show Undateable in Ferndale, Michigan.

Filmography 
Film
 Made of Honor (2008)
 Due Date (2010)
 Alvin and the Chipmunks: The Road Chip (2015)
 Diary of a Wimpy Kid: The Long Haul (2017) (uncredited)
 Rampage (2018)
 Scoob! (2020) (also executive producer)
 Black Adam (2022)

Television

References

External links

1978 births
American screenwriters
American television producers
Living people
University of Southern California alumni